The Valea Blaznei mine is a large mine in the north of Romania in Rodna, Bistrița-Năsăud County, 50 km southwest of Bistrița and 699 km north-west of the capital, Bucharest. Valea Blaznei represents one of the largest lead and zinc reserve in Romania having estimated reserves of 10.5 million tonnes of ore grading 0.76% lead and 2.48% zinc thus resulting in 0.08 million tonnes of lead and 0.26 million tonnes of zinc.

References 

Lead and zinc mines in Romania